Lalakah Mahalleh (also Romanized as Lalakah Maḩalleh; also known as Lalakah Maḩalleh-ye Chūbar) is a village in Chubar Rural District, Haviq District, Talesh County, Gilan Province, Iran. At the 2006 census, its population was 2,713, in 615 families.

References 

Populated places in Talesh County